Lackrana is a rural locality on Flinders Island in the local government area of Flinders in the North-east region of Tasmania. The 2016 census determined a population of 75 for the state suburb of Lackrana.

History
Lackrana was gazetted as a locality in 1963.

Geography
Bass Strait forms the eastern boundary.

Road infrastructure
The B85 route (Lady Barron Road) enters from the south-west and exits to the south. Route C803 (Lackrana Road) starts at an intersection with B85 near the south-west boundary and runs north through the locality before exiting.

References

Flinders Island
Towns in Tasmania